Azerbaijani Air Forces and Air Defence often referred to as the Azerbaijani Air Force is the air force and air defence force of the Azerbaijani Armed Forces.

History
The roots of the current organisation go back to June 26, 1918, when the Azerbaijan Democratic Republic bought its first military aircraft. After independence in 1991, the presence of former Soviet air bases in Azerbaijan helped the Air and Air Defence Force develop.

On February 11, 2009, the commanding officer of the Air Force, Lieutenant General Rail Rzayev was assassinated outside his home. Rzayev had been reportedly negotiating closer ties with the United States regarding air force modernisation before his death, possibly including the acquisition of US fighter aircraft. The post was vacant until another officer, Mehtiev, was appointed in December 2009.

Organization
Brinkster.net reported in October 2004 that the Azerbaijani Air and Air Defence Force comprised a fighter squadron at Nasosnaya Air Base with MiG-25PDs and training variants, a bomber aviation regiment at Kyurdamir with Su-17/24/25, MiG-21s, and L-29/39s, a transport aviation squadron at Ganja Airport with Il-76s(?), Аn-12/24, and Тu-134s, a helicopter squadron at Baku Kala Air Base with Mi-2/8/24s, two aircraft repair factories, and two air defence missile units. Other air bases include Dollyar Air Base (which Jane's Sentinel says is reported to be non-operational) Nakhchivan Airport in the Nakhchivan exclave, Sanqacal Air Base, and Sitalcay Air Base.

Air Defence Force
The Air Defence Force is a component of the Air and Air Defence Force of Azerbaijan. There are some installations of the Cold War era left by the Soviets in 1990.

Education
The Azerbaijan Higher Military Aviation School is the educational institution of the Azerbaijani Air Force and a branch of the education system of the Ministry of Defense of Azerbaijan. In 1997, the school graduated its first class of military pilots. By presidential decree of 24 December 2015, the school was abolished and transferred to the Azerbaijan Higher Military Academy with the establishment of the corresponding faculties there.

Azerbaijani pilots are trained at the Azerbaijan Air Force School and then develop their skills further within their units. Azerbaijan has an experience exchange with Turkey, the United States, Ukraine, and a number of other NATO countries. Turkish Air Force School plays a great role in the training of military pilots. The Azerbaijani pilots are also trained in Ukraine's Pilot Training School.

Infrastructure
The United States is the most active participant in the modernisation of Air Force airfields. Airfields in Gala and the Nasosnaya Air Base near Haji Zeynalabidin settlement have been modernised with US support as part of the Azerbaijan-NATO Individual Partnership Action Plan. Special equipment were installed there to provide flight security. The starting command points, engineering control systems and engineering air force service were provided with new buildings. Negotiations over the modernisation of Kurdamir airfield are currently under way. An advanced Flight Control System has been installed at Dollyar Air Base with support from the United States.

Since September 2008, Turkey has helped to modernise the Air Force central command headquarters. According to a Turkish-Azerbaijani agreement, a NATO standard central command management center will be installed there. A great number of projects such as joint manufacture of unmanned aircraft will be implemented with Turkey in the near future.

The Gabala OTH Radar was operated by the Russian Space Forces. The radar station had a range of up to 6,000 kilometres (3,728 mi), and was designed to detect missile launches as far as from the Indian Ocean. It is not known whether Russia shared any of the radar's data with Azerbaijan. The equipment was dismantled and sent back to Russia after 2012.

In 2006, the US provided Azerbaijani military with additional radar installations. Plans were announced for the US to modernize one radar station near the Iranian border at Lerik and another near the border with Georgia at Agstafa. Joint work also commenced on two radar stations on the Russia-Azerbaijani border and Iran-Azerbaijani border to monitor Caspian Sea traffic.

Equipment

Aircraft
The MiG-29 has been designated as the standard aircraft for the AzAF.
In September–October 2010, Azerbaijan purchased 24 Mi-35M from Rostvertol. 8 of them have been delivered in the end of the first quarter of 2012 and four more in August 2012.
With the arrival of the MiG-29s, the Air Force appears to have retired the MiG-25 aircraft that it used to fly from Nasosnaya Air Base. IISS estimates in 2007 reported 26 as still in service; other figures previously placed the total as high as 38.

The Air Force retains in store and L-39 fighter training aircraft produced in the Czech Republic and Ukraine.

Azerbaijan also manufactures Israeli-designed spy planes. Among the licensed UAVs is the Orbiter-2M and the Aerostar. Both are manufactured at the government-owned Azad Systems Company plant near Baku. The head of the Defense Industry, Yaver Jamalov, said that by the end of 2011 a total of 60 UAVs will be produced.

In 2016 three Bell 412 helicopters were purchased from Canada, and by 2018 a number of pilots were trained in the type. A further undisclosed number of Bell 407 and MD-530 helicopters were obtained but neither type is currently operational as pilots have not been trained yet.

Current inventory

Future developments
Jane's said in 2009 that 'efforts to acquire more modern hardware are understood to have been underway for several years, but funding constraints proved to be a stumbling block. Until quite recently, only limited success was achieved, with the most significant addition to the inventory being a handful of Su-25s that were obtained from Georgia in 2002. In 2007, however, Azerbaijan took delivery of the first of a substantial number of MiG-29 'Fulcrum' fighters. These are understood to have originated from disparate sources, including Belarus, Russia and Ukraine, with at least some having been overhauled at Odessa in Ukraine prior to delivery.

On 20 February 2020, Azerbaijan's Defense Minister Zakir Hasanov signed a preliminary agreement on the procurement of Alenia Aermacchi M-346 Master during the President Ilham Aliyev visit to Italy on that day. The Air Force plans to purchase 10-15 aircraft.

Air defense equipment
Azerbaijan has also a number of missile systems covering Azerbaijani airspace. The S-75 Dvina has been installed around Baku and additional installations are near the border with Iran and Dagestan. Some are installed to defend against Armenian aircraft. In terms of numbers, the IISS reported in 2002 that Azerbaijan had 100 S-75 Dvina, S-125 Neva/Pechora, and S-200 systems. Among them are the medium range 2K11 Krug, for short range the 9K33 Osa and the 9K35 Strela-10 mobile SAM and the ZSU-23-4 Shilka vehicles to cover the armored forces against airstrikes. Azerbaijan has also lighter AA guns and MANPADS of varying quality.

In 2009 Azerbaijan's Defence Ministry signed a contract with Russia's Rosoboronexport company to buy two battalions of S-300PMU-2 Favorit.

In January 2012, Azerbaijan and Israel signed a $1.6 billion deal that includes anti-aircraft and missile defense systems.

Air defense

Accidents and incidents
 29 January 2008: An Azerbaijani Air Force MiG-29UB crashed into the Caspian Sea during a training flight. Both crew members on board the MiG-29UB were killed.
 3 March 2010: An Azerbaijani Air Force Su-25 crashed in the Tovuz region of Azerbaijan, killing the pilot, Famil Mammadli.
 3 February 2011: An Azerbaijani Air and Air Defence Force Su-25UB crashed in the Kurdamir region of Azerbaijan. Both crew members were not injured.
 24 July 2019: During a night training flight, a MiG-29 fighter of the Azerbaijani Air Force crashed into the Caspian Sea after a bird strike.Pilot  Colonel-Lieutenant Rashad Atakishiev is heavilly injured in aircraft and crashed into the Caspian Sea The pilot was killed in the crash.
 28 February 2022: Three Azerbaijani MiG-29 fighters were destroyed by Russian rocket attacks while undergoing repairs at Lviv State Aircraft Plant in Ukraine.

See also
Azerbaijani Land Forces
Military history of Azerbaijan

References 

Azerbaijani Air Forces
Military units and formations established in 1992
1992 establishments in Azerbaijan